As Long as You're Near Me is a 1953 West German drama film directed by Harald Braun and starring Maria Schell and O.W. Fischer and Hardy Krüger. It was shot at the Bavaria Studios in Munich. The film's sets were designed by the art director Walter Haag. It was entered into the 1954 Cannes Film Festival.

Cast
 Brigitte Horney as Mona Arendt
 O.W. Fischer as Frank Tornau
 Maria Schell as Eva Berger
 Walter Richter as Willi
 Liesl Karlstadt as L'habilleuse
 Mathias Wieman as Paul
 Hardy Krüger as Stefan Berger
 Paul Bildt as Bentz
 Heini Göbel
 Hans Henn
 Michael Lenz
 Wolfgang Molander
 Gudrun Rabente
 Rudolf Vogel

References

Bibliography 
 Bock, Hans-Michael & Bergfelder, Tim. The Concise Cinegraph: Encyclopaedia of German Cinema. Berghahn Books, 2009.

External links

1953 films
1953 drama films
German drama films
West German films
1950s German-language films
German black-and-white films
Films directed by Harald Braun
Films about filmmaking
1950s German films
Films shot at Bavaria Studios